CAN-BIKE is a Canadian cycling skills course offered across the country by Cycling Canada Cyclisme. It is a nationally standardized series of courses on all aspects of cycling safety oriented toward recreational and utilitarian cycling. The courses are taught by certified cycling instructors, and through a variety of organizations who are interested in education, safety and health.

CAN-BIKE follows the basic philosophy of vehicular cycling, which owes much of its approach to the ideas of John Forester.

Courses offered
Level 1 - Fundamentals of Cycling 
Level 2 - Cycling Basics & Bike Rodeo 
Level 3 - Core Cycling Skills 
Level 4 - Advanced Cycling Skills 
Level 5 - Instructor Training
Commuter Cycling Skills 
Bicycle Maintenance 101
Rural Cycling
Women Only 
Older Adult

External links
Cycling Canada Cyclisme website
CAN-BIKE website
CAN-BIKE through the City of Toronto

Cycling organizations in Canada